Anna Nikolayevna Zadorozhniuk (born October 25, 1984) is a Ukrainian retired ice dancer. With partner Sergei Verbillo, she was the 2009 and 2010 Ukrainian national champion. Zadorozhniuk previously skated with Alexander Veselovski and Alexander Kudriavtsev. She married fellow figure skater, Roman Serov in 2011.

Programs 
(with Verbillo)

Competitive highlights
(with Verbillo)

References

External links 

 

Sportspeople from Odesa
Ukrainian female ice dancers
1984 births
Living people
Figure skaters at the 2010 Winter Olympics
Olympic figure skaters of Ukraine
Competitors at the 2005 Winter Universiade